Leir is a fictional character appearing in American comic books published by Marvel Comics. He is one of the Celtic gods of Avalon, the god of lightning and the spear.  For quite some time, enmity existed between the gods of Avalon and the gods of Asgard. Leir is based on Lir in Celtic mythology.

Fictional character biography
Leir dwelt in the realm of Avalon with the other Celtic gods.

When the Heliopolitan god Seth sought to make war against the other gods, he dispatched foul beasts to both Avalon and Asgard. Thor pursued a griffin-like beast through a dimensional rift to Avalon. When the Celtic gods saw Thor, they blamed him for the arrival of the beasts, and Leir battled Thor due to the misunderstanding. Hogun the Grim had followed Thor to offer his support. The three gods battled the beast and drove it off. Leir felt he owed Thor a debt for helping against the winged monster, and sent a force of Celtic gods, including Caber, to battle the armies of Seth when he attacked Asgard.

Leir and Caber next attacked the camp of the Fomorians, the traditional enemies of Avalon. Leir and Caber later entered Asgard again through a dimensional portal. Leir attempted to claim Sif as his bride, but she said he must help rescue Thor, and battle her champion. Leir and Caber clashed with Heimdall in Asgard, and then accompanied Sif to Earth in search of Thor. Leir, Caber, and Sif then traveled to the Black Galaxy and found Thor there. The gods then traveled to Asgard, with Hercules. Leir, Caber, and Hercules then battled Ymir, and witnessed Asgard's victory over Ymir and Surtur. Leir then challenged Thor to a duel over Sif, believing him to be her champion, but was instead defeated in a duel with Sif.

Powers and abilities
Leir possesses the typical powers of a member of the race of super-humans known as the Celtic gods of Avalon. This includes superhuman strength, speed, durability, stamina, and reflexes, and an extremely long lifespan.

Leir can generate electrical energy from his hands as a lightning-like spear, which he uses as a weapon. He also wields a shield of unknown properties.

Leir is a highly proficient hand-to-hand combatant, a good swordsman, and an expert at spear-throwing.

References

External links

http://www.marvel.com/universe/Leir

Characters created by Ron Frenz
Characters created by Tom DeFalco
Fictional blade and dart throwers
Fictional characters with electric or magnetic abilities
Fictional characters with superhuman durability or invulnerability
Fictional gods
Fictional polearm and spearfighters
Fictional swordfighters in comics
Marvel Comics characters who can move at superhuman speeds
Marvel Comics characters who use magic
Marvel Comics characters with superhuman strength
Marvel Comics deities